Khush Tazeh (also Romanized as Khūsh Tāzeh; also known as Hūsh) is a village in Dizmar-e Sharqi Rural District, Minjavan District, Khoda Afarin County, East Azerbaijan Province, Iran. At the 2006 census, its population was 32, in 9 families.

References 

Populated places in Khoda Afarin County